Pachira aquatica is a tropical wetland tree in the mallow family Malvaceae, native to Central and South America where it grows in swamps. It is known by its common names Malabar chestnut, French peanut, Guiana chestnut, Provision tree, Saba nut, Monguba (Brazil), Pumpo (Guatemala) and is commercially sold under the names Money tree and Money plant. This tree is sometimes sold with a braided trunk and is commonly grown as a houseplant, although more commonly what is sold as a "Pachira aquatica" houseplant is in fact a similar species, P. glabra.

The genus name is derived from a language spoken in Guyana. The species name is Latin for "aquatic". It is classified in the subfamily Bombacoideae of the family Malvaceae. Previously it was assigned to Bombacaceae. The name "money tree" is believed to refer to a story of its origin, in which a poor man prayed for money, found this "odd" plant, took it home as an omen, and made money selling plants grown from its seeds.

Description

It has shiny green palmate leaves with lanceolate leaflets and smooth green bark. This species forms a slightly thickened root with smaller roots or roots, which also serves as a water reservoir. The relatively smooth bark is brown through gray and slightly cracked; young branches are green. Outdoors, P. aquatica produces a broad crown. The transitional and long-stalked, composite hand-shaped, slightly leathery leaves are arranged at the branch ends. The petiole is up to 24 cm long. The leaves are bright green and shiny and consist of up to nine leaflets (fingers). The mostly glabrous, short-stalked leaflets are up through 28 cm long and rounded through round pointed, spiked, or pointed. They are lanceolate or obovate, with a light middle veins. There are sloping stipules present. The leaves and flowers are also often eaten.

Its showy flowers, among the largest tree flowers in the world, have long, narrow petals that open like a banana peel to reveal hairlike yellowish orange stamens. The greenish-yellow or cream-colored, hermaphroditic and very large, short and thick-stalked flowers with double perianth resemble shaving brushes through the long stamens. The terminal, single, twofold, or threefold flowers suggest that bats are the pollinators. The outside fine-haired, green-brown and overgrown calyx is cup-shaped and about 2 cm long. The narrow, elongated petals can reach up to 30 cm long. The approximately 180–250 pinkish stamens with elongated anthers are overgrown and tufted above. The five-chambered ovaries uppermost with a long stylus with divided, short lobed scar. The capsules are large, brown, woody, up to 20-30 cm long, rough, and egg-shaped, with a diameter of about 10–15 cm, weigh about 1–1.5 kg, and contain 10–25 nuts.

Cultivation

The tree grows well as a tropical ornamental in moist, frost-free areas, and can be started from seed or cutting. It is a durable plant and adapts well to different conditions. The plant requires bright light, but not direct sunlight. When grown indoors it requires a very gradual introduction to direct sunlight outdoors to reduce the chances of sunburning its leaves. This tree thrives in both common potting soil and water in a hydroponic system. 

The plant grows well in bright light, but also tolerates partial shade at room temperatures from 12 °C through 25 °C. A plant's leaves may turn yellow and fall when days are shorter in autumn which is not a sign of disease, and the plant will restart its growth without problem the following spring. A tree is mature when 4–5 years old. It produces its first fruit in spring and fall. Furthermore, it can withstand temperatures as low as 5 °C without losing its leaves, although people recommended not growing it below 12 °C as an orangery tree, the ideal culture temperature being about 20 °C all year round with high humidity. An occasional weak frost can cause it to lose its leaves, and it grows new leaves in the following spring.

The best performance and longevity in cultivation can be achieved if it is kept in rather dry soil, especially in the winter months. Dry indoor air is to be avoided. It is best sprayed or misted daily; otherwise it can shed all its leaves. In its  first year as a house plant, a plant should not be fertilized. Thereafter, some fertilizer can be used during watering in summer. Under good growth conditions, this species grows quite rapidly. If it becomes too large, it can simply be cut back to a desired size. After about 1–2 weeks, new shoots will emerge. A variety from Hawaii is grown in lava stone as bonsai. Such a plant grows extremely slowly.

This species is occasionally cultivated for its nuts, which grow in a large, woody capsule. The nuts are light brown, striped with white, about 2–3 cm long, and embedded in a spongy and fibrous pericarp. The capsule is not eaten. The nuts develop within until the capsule bursts and releases them. The nuts are considered edible, with a flavor similar to a European chestnut. Some people grind the nuts and use them in a hot drink. They are toxic to rats in the raw state, but are consumed by people raw or roasted.

Culture

In East Asia, Pachira aquatica is often referred to as the "shake money tree" (搖錢樹).  This tree has long been popular as an ornamental in Japan.  In 1986, a Taiwanese truck driver first cultivated five small trees in a single flowerpot with their trunks braided.  The popularity of these ornamentals took off in Japan and later much of the rest of East Asia.  They are symbolically associated with good financial fortune and are typically seen in businesses, sometimes with red ribbons or other ornamentation attached.  The trees play an important role in Taiwan's agricultural export economy with exports of NT$250 million (US$7 million) in 2005. However, many specimens in cultivation sold as Pachira aquatica are actually the similar species, P. glabra, which develops a thick base at a younger age and has a smaller growth habit, less showy flowers, and a 6" green seed capsule rather than 12" brown seed capsule.

Chemistry

The presence of cyclopropenoid fatty acids (CPFAs) in the nuts has been used to state that the nuts are not edible and not suitable for human consumption, despite the nut being eaten or used in medicine. At least one review indicates that CPFAs are carcinogenic, co-carcinogenic, and have medical and other effects on animals; according to this review, "CPFA in food is dangerous to human health." Out of 6 rats tested in a study of P. aquatica, 5 died after consuming the nuts. The surviving rat had enlarged organs including the stomach, liver, pancreas, kidneys, lungs and also had spleen atrophy. Research on the health effects of eating the nuts on humans is currently lacking, but we can find some studies regarding nutritional facts and food utilization as well.

Gallery

References

External links

 Class effort gives Taiwan world leadership in 'money tree' exports. Taiwan Headlines reprint from United Daily News. 9 February 2006.  Accessed 10 February 2007.
 "Fancy take on money trees puts Taiwan on the map." Taiwan Headlines reprint from Liberty Times. 23 March 2006.  Accessed 10 February 2007.
 "Malabar Chestnut" at California Rare Fruit Growers Fruit Facts
 "Pachira aquatica" at FloriData
 Composition and nutritional properties

Further reading

 Van Wyk, Ben-Erik (2005). Food Plants of the World. Portland, Oregon: Timber Press, Inc. 

Bombacoideae
Edible nuts and seeds
Trees of Central America
Trees of South America
Trees of Guatemala
Trees of Belize
Trees of Bolivia
Trees of Brazil
Trees of Colombia
Trees of Costa Rica
Trees of Guyana
Trees of Ecuador
Trees of Honduras
Trees of Mexico
Trees of Nicaragua
Trees of Panama
Trees of Peru
Trees of Suriname
Trees of Venezuela
Trees of French Guiana